Fromager d'Affinois is a French double-cream soft cheese made from cow's milk. It is produced by the Fromagerie Guilloteau company.

Fromager d'Affinois is similar to Brie in production and appearance. Unlike in Brie production, however, before cheese making the cow's milk undergoes a process called ultrafiltration. Ultrafiltration removes water from the pasteurised milk, concentrating all other components. It also has a similar flavour to Brie, but without the earthy notes of its counterpart.   One effect of this process is that it allows the acceleration of the cheese making process. Whereas classic Brie takes eight weeks to make, Fromager d'Affinois can be made in two weeks.  Ultrafiltration also results in a milk that retains more nutrients and proteins, and the cheese has a relatively high fat content of 60%.

The cheese is made in 4.4 pound (2.0 kilogram) wheels, and has a soft oozing texture inside with an edible white rind on the outside.

Blue-veined varieties are also available.

References

External links
 Fromagerie Guilloteau website

French cheeses
Brand name dairy products
Cow's-milk cheeses